The Civil War is a musical written by Gregory Boyd and Frank Wildhorn, with lyrics by Jack Murphy and music by Wildhorn. The musical centers on the American Civil War, with the musical numbers portraying the war through Union, Confederate, and slave viewpoints.  The musical was nominated for two Tony Awards, including the Tony Award for Best Musical.  Its styles include gospel, folk, country, rock, and rhythm and blues.

Production history
The musical had its world premiere at the Alley Theatre, Houston, Texas, on September 16, 1998, where co-author Boyd is the Artistic Director. The production was supervised by Gregory Boyd, with musical staging by George Faison and staging by Nick Corley. The cast featured Linda Eder (Hanna Hopes), Keith Byron Kirk (Frederick Douglass), Beth Leavel (Mrs. Lydia Bixby/Violet), Jesse Lenat (Autolycus Fell), Capathia Jenkins (Hope Jackson), Matt Bogart (Pvt. Nathaniel Taylor), and Michael Lanning (Capt. Emmet Lochran).

The musical premiered on Broadway at the St. James Theatre on April 22, 1999 and closed on June 13, 1999, running for 61 performances and 35 previews. Directed by Jerry Zaks with musical staging by Luis Perez, the cast featured Leavel as Mabel/Mrs. Bixby, Kirk as Frederick Douglass, Bogart as Private Sam Taylor, Gilles Chiasson (Corp. William McEwen), Capathia Jenkins (Harriet Jackson), David M. Lutken (Voice of Abraham Lincoln/Corp. Henry Stewart), Irene Molloy (Sarah McEwen), and Leo Burmester as Autolycus Fell.

A studio cast album was released in 1999 by Atlantic Records, and included Linda Eder, Maya Angelou, James Garner, Hootie & the Blowfish, Travis Tritt, Dr. John and Betty Buckley. Both a double-disc album was released as "The Complete Work", and a "highlights" version entitled "The Nashville Sessions". "The Nashville Sessions" charted on Billboard's Top Country Albums, eventually peaking at #48.

The musical toured in the United States, starting in January 2000 in Cincinnati, Ohio. The original cast of 28 was reduced to 15. "Rather than playing individual characters, they all play everyman - a soldier, a wife, a nurse, a girlfriend, a slave." Stephen Rayne directed, with a cast that included Larry Gatlin alternating with John Schneider and BeBe Winans.

The Civil War was one of the productions produced at the newly renovated Ford's Theatre (Washington, D.C.), running from March 27, 2009 through May 24. Directed by Jeff Calhoun, the 16-member cast featured Jarrod Emick, Eleasha Gamble, Michael Lanning and Timothy Shew, with the recorded voice of Hal Holbrook as Lincoln. The production is conceived in a concert setting.

In 2006, a new version of the musical opened at the Majestic Theatre in Gettysburg, Pennsylvania. Called For the Glory: The Civil War Musical in Gettysburg, it featured two new songs and a new structure.

Songs
(As presented on Broadway, 1999)

Act 1
A House Divided – The Citizens
Freedom's Child – Frederick Douglass and Abolitionists
By The Sword / Sons of Dixie – The Armies
Tell My Father – Private Sam Taylor
The Peculiar Institution – The Enslaved
If Prayin' Were Horses – Clayton Toler and Bessie Toler
Greenback – Autolycus Fell, Mabel and Violet
Missing You (My Bill) – Sarah McEwen
Judgment Day – Captain Billy Pierce, Captain Emmett Lochran, Private Sam Taylor and The Armies
Father, How Long? – Clayton Toler
Someday  – Harriet Jackson, Bessie Toler and Others
I'll Never Pass This Way Again – Corporal Henry Stewart
How Many Devils? – The Armies

Act 2
Virginia – Captain Billy Pierce
Candle in the Window – Harriet Jackson
Oh! Be Joyful! – Autolycus Fell, Sergeant Byron Richardson, Private Conrad Bock and Private Elmore Hotchkiss
The Hospital – Mrs. Bixby, Nurse, Union Soldiers and Clayton Toler
If Prayin' Were Horses (Reprise)  – Clayton Toler and Bessie Toler
River Jordan – Benjamin Reynolds and Others
Sarah – Corporal William McEwen
The Honor of Your Name – Sarah McEwen
Greenback (Reprise) – Autolycus Fell and Violet
Northbound Train – Captain Emmett Lochran
Last Waltz for Dixie – Captain Billy Pierce and Confederate Soldiers
The Glory – Captain Emmett Lochran, Frederick Douglass, Benjamin Reynolds and Full Company

Reception
The Variety review of the Alley Theatre production said that the show was not "a traditional musical as a revue-style presentation of a song cycle. Wildhorn and co-creators Jack Murphy and Gregory Boyd impose precious little narrative structure on 'The Civil War', preferring instead to integrate individual, self-contained vignettes as elements in a thematically consistent but essentially bookless concert". The production used "rear-screen projections of photos, paintings and letters [to] evoke the period setting".

It was panned by critics, including The New York Times, which found it "generic...without plot and essentially without character".

The song "Tell My Father", originating from the musical, was adapted into a choir piece by Andrea Ramsey and continues to be performed by male choirs, separated from its original work.

Recordings

The Nashville Sessions

The Complete Work

Awards and nominations

Original Broadway production

References

External links
Internet Broadway Database listing
The Civil War production, song list and plot at guidetomusicaltheatre.com
The Civil War at the Music Theatre International website
Review, Entertainment Weekly
 Interview with Michael Lanning, (Captain Lochran)

1999 musicals
Broadway musicals
Musical compositions about the American Civil War
Musicals by Frank Wildhorn
Musicals inspired by real-life events
Plays set in the 19th century